The Video Game Masters Tournament was an event that was created in 1983 by Twin Galaxies to generate world record high scores for the 1984 U.S. Edition of the Guinness Book of World Records. It was the most prestigious contest of that era and the only one that the Guinness book looked to for verified world records on video games at the time. This contest was conducted under the joint efforts of Twin Galaxies and the U.S. National Video Game Team in 1983, 1984 and 1985 and by the U.S. National Video Game Team alone in 1986 and 1987.

During its first year, 1983, the event was called the North America Video Game Challenge (State Teams Tournament), but was changed to the Video Game Masters Tournament by the second year.

In order to administer the contest, Twin Galaxies appointed the U.S. National Video Game Team to the task of collecting and verifying scores from the eight cities that participated in the 1983 edition of this event. The cities were Seattle, Washington; Lake Odessa, Michigan; Coeur D'Alene, Idaho; Omaha, Nebraska; Dayton, Ohio; San Jose, California; Upland, California and Chicago, Illinois.

The 1984 event was also conducted in eight cities while the 1985 event was conducted in 35 cities.

1983 Event - August 24–28, 1983

1984 Event  - June 29 - July 1, 1984

1985 Event  - June 28–30, 1985
The 1985 Video Game Masters Tournament was conducted as a fundraiser to raise donations for CARE. The fundraiser set aside half of all entry fees for the CARE/Twin Galaxies African Relief Fund.

1986 Event  - June 27–29, 1986

1987 Event  - July 3–5, 1987

References 

Video game organizations
Youth culture
Computing culture
Defunct esports competitions
Video game gameplay
1983 establishments in the United States
1987 disestablishments in the United States